The Paleo-Hebrew script, also Palaeo-Hebrew, Proto-Hebrew or Old Hebrew, is the writing system found in inscriptions of Canaanite languages (incl. pre-biblical and biblical Ancient Hebrew) from the region of Southern Canaan, also known as biblical Israel and Judah. It is considered to be the script used to record the original texts of the Hebrew Bible due to its similarity to the Samaritan script, as the Talmud stated that the Hebrew ancient script was still used by the Samaritans. The Talmud described it as the "Libona'a script" (Aramaic לִיבּוֹנָאָה Lībōnāʾā), translated by some as "Lebanon script". Use of the term "Paleo-Hebrew alphabet" is due to a 1954 suggestion by Solomon Birnbaum, who argued that "[t]o apply the term Phoenician [ancient Phoenicia or modern Lebanon being Northern Canaan] to the script of the Hebrews [ancient Israel-Judah or modern Israel/Palestine being Southern Canaan] is hardly suitable". The Paleo-Hebrew and Phoenician alphabets are two slight regional variants of the same script. 

The first Paleo-Hebrew inscription identified in modern times was the Shebna inscription, found in 1870, and then referred to as "two large ancient Hebrew inscriptions in Phoenician letters". Fewer than 2,000 inscriptions are known today, of which the vast majority comprise just a single letter or word. The earliest known examples of Paleo-Hebrew writing date to the 10th century BCE.

Like the Phoenician alphabet, it is a slight regional variant and an immediate continuation of the Proto-Canaanite script, which was used throughout Canaan in the Late Bronze Age. Phoenician, Hebrew, and all of their sister Canaanite languages were largely indistinguishable dialects before that time. The Paleo-Hebrew script is an abjad of 22 consonantal letters, exactly as the other Canaanite scripts from the period.

By the 5th century BCE, among Judeans the alphabet had been mostly replaced by the Aramaic alphabet as officially used in the Achaemenid Empire. The "Jewish square-script" variant now known simply as the Hebrew alphabet evolved directly out of the Aramaic script by about the 3rd century BCE (although some letter shapes did not become standard until the 1st century CE). By contrast, the Samaritan alphabet, as used by Samaritans, is an immediate continuation of the Proto-Hebrew script without intermediate non-Israelite evolutionary stages. There is also some continued use of the old Hebrew script in Jewish religious contexts down to the 1st century BCE, notably in the Paleo-Leviticus text found in the Dead Sea scrolls.

History

Origins 

The Paleo-Hebrew and Phoenician alphabets developed in the wake of the Bronze Age collapse, out of their immediate predecessor script Proto-Canaanite (Late Proto-Sinaitic) during the 13th to 12th centuries BCE, and earlier Proto-Sinaitic scripts.

The 22 letters were carved on one side of the  stone, which resembles a bowl on the other. The find is attributed to the mid-10th century BCE. The so-called Ophel inscription is of a similar age, but difficult to interpret, and may be classified as either Proto-Canaanite or as Paleo-Hebrew. The Gezer calendar is of uncertain date, but may also still date to the 10th century BCE.

The script on the Zayit Stone and Gezer Calendar are an earlier form than the classical Paleo-Hebrew of the 8th century and later; this early script is almost identical to the early Phoenician script on the 9th-century Ahiram sarcophagus inscription. By the 8th century, a number of regional characteristics begin to separate the script into a number of national alphabets, including the Israelite (Israel and Judah), Moabite (Moab and Ammon), Edomite, Phoenician and Old Aramaic scripts.

Linguistic features of the Moabite language (rather than generic Northwest Semitic) are visible in the Mesha Stele inscription, commissioned around 840 BCE by King Mesha of Moab. Similarly, the Tel Dan Stele, dated approximately 810 BCE, is written in Old Aramaic, dating from a period when Dan had already fallen into the orbit of Damascus.

The oldest inscriptions identifiable as Biblical Hebrew have long been limited to the 8th century BCE. In 2008, however, a potsherd (ostracon) bearing an inscription was excavated at Khirbet Qeiyafa which has since been interpreted as representing a recognizably Hebrew inscription dated to as early as the 10th century BCE. The argument identifying the text as Hebrew relies on the use of vocabulary.

From the 8th century onward, Hebrew epigraphy becomes more common, showing the gradual spread of literacy among the people of the Kingdom of Israel and the Kingdom of Judah; the oldest portions of the Hebrew Bible, although transmitted via the recension of the Second Temple period, are also dated to the 8th century BCE.

Use in the Israelite kingdoms 

The Paleo-Hebrew alphabet was in common use in the kingdoms of Israel and Judah throughout the 8th and 7th centuries BCE. During the 6th century BCE, the time of the Babylonian exile, the Paleo-Hebrew alphabet was gradually replaced by the use of the Imperial Aramaic alphabet. The letters of Imperial Aramaic were again given shapes characteristic for writing Hebrew during the Second Temple period, developing into the "square shape" of the Hebrew alphabet.

The Samaritans, who remained in the Land of Israel, continued to use their variant of the Paleo-Hebrew alphabet, called the Samaritan script. After the fall of the Persian Empire, Jews used both scripts before settling on the Assyrian form.

The Paleo-Hebrew script evolved by developing numerous cursive features, the lapidary features of the Phoenician alphabet being ever less pronounced with the passage of time. The aversion of the lapidary script may indicate that the custom of erecting stelae by the kings and offering votive inscriptions to the deity was not widespread in Israel. Even the engraved inscriptions from the 8th century exhibit elements of the cursive style, such as the shading, which is a natural feature of pen-and-ink writing. Examples of such inscriptions include the Siloam inscription, numerous tomb inscriptions from Jerusalem, the Ketef Hinnom scrolls, a fragmentary Hebrew inscription on an ivory which was taken as war spoils (probably from Samaria) to Nimrud, the Arad ostraca dating to the 6th-century BCE, the hundreds of 8th to 6th-century Hebrew seals from various sites, and the Paleo-Hebrew Leviticus scroll discovered near Tel Qumran. The most developed cursive script is found on the 18 Lachish ostraca, letters sent by an officer to the governor of Lachish just before the destruction of the First Temple in 586 BCE. A slightly earlier (circa 620 BCE) but similar script is found on an ostracon excavated at Mesad Hashavyahu, containing a petition for redress of grievances (an appeal by a field worker to the fortress's governor regarding the confiscation of his cloak, which the writer considers to have been unjust).

Decline and late survival 

After the Babylonian capture of Judea, when most of the nobles were taken into exile, the Paleo-Hebrew alphabet continued to be used by the people who remained. One example of such writings are the 6th-century BCE jar handles from Gibeon, on which the names of winegrowers are inscribed. Beginning from the 5th century BCE onward, the Aramaic language and script became an official means of communication. Paleo-Hebrew was still used by scribes and others.

The Paleo-Hebrew script was retained for some time as an archaizing or conservative mode of writing. It is found in certain texts of the Torah among the Dead Sea Scrolls, dated to the 2nd to 1st centuries BCE: manuscripts 4Q12, 6Q1: Genesis. 4Q22: Exodus. 1Q3, 2Q5, 4Q11, 4Q45, 4Q46, 6Q2, and the Leviticus scroll (11QpaleoLev). In some Qumran documents, the tetragrammaton name of the Israelite deity, YHWH, is written in Paleo-Hebrew while the rest of the text is rendered in the adopted Aramaic square script that became today’s normative Jewish Hebrew script. The vast majority of the Hasmonean coinage, as well as the coins of the First Jewish–Roman War and Bar Kokhba's revolt, bears Paleo-Hebrew legends. The Paleo-Hebrew alphabet fell completely out of use among Jews only after 135 CE.

Legacy

Samaritan alphabet 

The paleo-Hebrew alphabet continued to be used by the Samaritans and over time developed into the Samaritan alphabet. The Samaritans have continued to use the script for writing both Hebrew and Aramaic texts until the present day. A comparison of the earliest Samaritan inscriptions and the medieval and modern Samaritan manuscripts clearly indicates that the Samaritan script is a static script which was used mainly as a book hand.

Talmud 
The Talmudic sages did not share a uniform stance on the subject of Paleo-Hebrew. Some stated that Paleo-Hebrew was the original script used by the Israelites at the time of the Exodus, whereas the Aramaic square script was brought from Assyria and introduced for writing Torah scrolls in the post-exilic period, while others believed that Paleo-Hebrew merely served as a stopgap in a time when the ostensibly original script (the Assyrian Script) was lost. According to both opinions, Ezra the Scribe (c. 500 BCE) introduced, or reintroduced the Assyrian script to be used as the primary alphabet for the Hebrew language. The arguments given for both opinions are rooted in Jewish scripture and/or tradition.

A third opinion in the Talmud states that the script never changed altogether. Rabbi Eleazar from Modiin, the sage who expressed this opinion, based his opinion on a scriptural verse, which makes reference to the shape of the letter vav. He argues further that, given the commandment to copy a Torah scroll directly from another, the script could not conceivably have been modified at any point. A different version of the debate in the Jerusalem Talmud refers to the circular shapes of the letters Ayin in Paleo-Hebrew and Samekh in square script on the stone tablets as miracles according to the respective sages arguing for one script or the other. This third opinion was accepted by some early Jewish scholars, and rejected by others, partially because it was permitted to write the Torah in Greek.

Contemporary use

Use of Proto-Hebrew in modern Israel is negligible, but it is found occasionally in nostalgic or pseudo-archaic examples, e.g. on the ₪1 coin ( "Judea") and in the logo of the Israeli town Nahariyah (Deuteronomy 33:24  "Let Asher be blessed with children").

Archaeology
In 2019, the Israel Antiquities Authority (IAA) unearthed a 2,600 year-old seal impression, while conducting excavations at the City of David, containing paleo-Hebrew script, and which is thought to have belonged to a certain "Nathan-Melech," an official in King Josiah's court.

Table of letters 

Phoenician or Paleo-Hebrew characters were never standardised and are found in numerous variant shapes. A general tendency of more cursive writing can be observed over the period of c. 800 BCE to 600 BCE. After 500 BCE, it is common to distinguish the script variants by names such as "Samaritan", "Aramaic", etc.

There is no difference in "Paleo-Hebrew" vs. "Phoenician" letter shapes. The names are applied depending on the language of the inscription, or if that cannot be determined, of the coastal (Phoenician) vs. highland (Hebrew) association (c.f. the Zayit Stone abecedary).

Unicode
The Unicode block Phoenician (U+10900–U+1091F) is intended for the representation of, apart from the Phoenician alphabet, text in Palaeo-Hebrew, Archaic Phoenician, Early Aramaic, Late Phoenician cursive, Phoenician papyri, Siloam Hebrew, Hebrew seals, Ammonite, Moabite, and Punic.

See also 

 Ancient Hebrew writings
 Ancient North Arabian
 Biblical Hebrew orthography
 History of the Hebrew alphabet
 Proto-Canaanite alphabet

References

Further reading
 "Alphabet, Hebrew". Encyclopaedia Judaica (CD-ROM Edition Version 1.0). Ed. Cecil Roth. Keter Publishing House.

External links 

 Hebrew Alphabet at the Jewish Encyclopedia
 History of the Aleph-Bet at the Jewish Virtual Library
 Aramaic/Paleo-Hebrew alphabet at Omniglot
 Unicode Modern/Paleo-Hebrew conversion tool
 Paleo-Hebrew Abjad font (the current version of the font is 1.1.0)
 Open-source Unicode Hebrew Fonts

Ancient Jewish history
Canaanite writing systems
Hebrew alphabet
Language and mysticism
Obsolete writing systems
Proto-Sinaitic script
Right-to-left writing systems